Lisa DeBenedictis is an American singer, songwriter, and record producer, who releases her music via a number of outlets including Magnatune and iTunes. DeBenedictis dropped out of music school, but can play the piano, guitar and mandolin. Her music contains mainly guitar and piano, with synth, smart and frequently dark lyrics.

Remixes 
Since the release of a set of vocal samples on ccMixter under a Creative Commons license, her songs have been remixed and sampled extensively by several artists from different countries. The samples were released for a remixing competition which was an idea for publicity of her work by John Buckman.

Discography 
 Fruitless (album), 2004
 Tigers (album), 2005
 Mixter One (album), 2007
 Welcome to Our World (remix album), 2012

References

External links
 Official website

Living people
Magnatune artists
American women singers
American women songwriters
Creative Commons-licensed authors
21st-century American pianists
21st-century American women pianists
Year of birth missing (living people)